State Route 172 (SR 172) is a state highway in Clark County, Nevada. The route provides access to Hoover Dam from Interstate 11 (I-11)/U.S. Route 93 (US 93)/U.S. Route 93 Business.

Route description

Proceeding northward for only a few feet, it turns right onto the old Nevada Highway, the original route of US 93. From there, the route travels eastward, following the curvy mountainside over Rough Summit headed toward Hoover Dam. While the state highway designation ends at this point, the Hoover Dam Access Road continues eastward, passing the Mike O'Callaghan – Pat Tillman Memorial Bridge Plaza, the Hoover Dam visitor center, and then crosses the dam itself into Arizona. However, it only runs a short distance in that state before looping through a new parking area at a helipad to return the way it came, the original road past that point being blocked off to prevent all but dam personnel from continuing further south.

History
SR 172 was originally part of US 93. US 93 was rerouted onto the Hoover Dam Bypass when construction was completed in October 2010, and the new state highway was designated over the old route.

Major intersections

References

172
172
Transportation in Clark County, Nevada